= Seminars in Immunology =

- Discipline: Immunology
- Language: English

Publication details
- Publisher: Elsevier
- Impact factor: 10.671 (2021)

Standard abbreviations
- ISO 4: Semin. Immunol.

Indexing
- ISSN: 1044-5323

Links
- Journal homepage; Online archive

Seminars in Immunology is a peer-reviewed scientific journal that covers research on all aspects of research on immunology. The journal is published by Elsevier. The current Co-Editors are G. Kroemer (Cordeliers Research Centre) and Albert Mantovani (IRCCS Humanitas Research Hospital).

== Abstracting and indexing ==
The journal is abstracted and indexed in Scopus, the journal has a 2021 impact factor of 10.671.
